Broad Sound is a bay on the Massachusetts coast north of Boston. It lies on the west of Massachusetts Bay, between Nahant and Deer Island; Lynn harbor is at its north end. The main channel of Boston Harbor empties into the sound.

References 
 

Bays of Massachusetts
Bays of Essex County, Massachusetts
Bodies of water of Suffolk County, Massachusetts